Peter Dickson Pfitzinger (born August 29, 1957 in Camden, New Jersey) is an American former distance runner, who later became an author and exercise physiologist. 

He is best known for his accomplishments in the marathon, an event in which he represented the United States in two Summer Olympic Games: the Los Angeles Olympics (where Pfitzinger finished 11th) and the 1988 Seoul Olympics (where he placed 14th).

Marathon career

In the 1984 Olympic Marathon Team Trials in Buffalo, New York, Pfitzinger became immediately known among American marathoners by taking the lead halfway through the race, relinquishing it in the final mile, then storming past the heavily favored Alberto Salazar in the final fifty yards to win the race, in a time of 2:11:43. In the 1988 Olympic Marathon Team Trials, held in Jersey City, New Jersey, Pfitzinger finished 3rd in a time of 2:13:09, to qualify for his second Olympic Games.

In other marathons apart from the Olympic Trials and Olympic Games, Pfitzinger won the Syracuse (New York) marathon in 1981, the Wiri (New Zealand) marathon in 1983, and the San Francisco Marathon in 1983 and 1986. He was 2nd at the Montreal (Canada) marathon in 1983. He was 3rd at the Nike OTC Marathon in 1981 and at the New York City Marathon in 1987. 

He was a consistent performer: All of his 13 career marathons were run in times between 2:11:43 - 2:15:21 (2 in 2:11, 4 in 2:12, 3 in 2:13, 3 in 2:14, and 1 in 2:15). He won 5 of his 13 marathons, and finished 2nd or 3rd in 4 others. Apart from the Olympic Games marathons, his only other finishes outside the top 3 were at the New York City Marathon in 1986 (9th) and at the 1985 Marathon World Cup (Hiroshima, Japan), where he finished 18th.

Personal life

Pfitzinger is a 1979 graduate of Cornell University. He also holds a Master of Business Administration from Cornell's Johnson Graduate School of Management and a Master of Arts in exercise science from the University of Massachusetts at Amherst.

Pfitzinger is the co-author of two highly popular training books for distance runners - Advanced Marathoning (with Scott Douglas) and Faster Road Racing (with Philip Latter). He is also a senior writer for Running Times Magazine.

Pfitzinger's wife, Christine Pfitzinger, is also a former world-class runner. The Pfitzingers have lived in New Zealand - Chrissey's country of origin - since the mid-1990s.

Achievements

References

External links
 

1957 births
Living people
Sportspeople from Camden, New Jersey
American male long-distance runners
American male marathon runners
Olympic track and field athletes of the United States
Athletes (track and field) at the 1984 Summer Olympics
Athletes (track and field) at the 1988 Summer Olympics
Cornell University alumni
University of Massachusetts Amherst School of Public Health and Health Sciences alumni